John Edwin Lee (January 27, 1928 - September 22, 2014) was an American politician. He was a Democratic member of the Mississippi State Senate from 1976 to 1984.

References 

1928 births
2014 deaths
Democratic Party members of the Mississippi House of Representatives
People from Morton, Mississippi